The 8th Los Angeles Film Critics Association Awards, honoring the best filmmaking of 1982, were announced on 11 December 1982.

Winners
Best Picture:
E.T. the Extra-Terrestrial
Runner-up: Gandhi
Best Director:
Steven Spielberg – E.T. the Extra-Terrestrial
Runner-up: Richard Attenborough – Gandhi
Best Actor:
Ben Kingsley – Gandhi
Runner-up: Peter O'Toole – My Favorite Year
Best Actress:
Meryl Streep – Sophie's Choice
Runner-up: Jessica Lange – Frances
Best Supporting Actor:
John Lithgow – The World According to Garp
Runner-up: James Mason – The Verdict
Best Supporting Actress:
Glenn Close – The World According to Garp
Runner-up: Cher – Come Back to the Five and Dime, Jimmy Dean, Jimmy Dean
Best Screenplay:
Larry Gelbart and Murray Schisgal – Tootsie
Runner-up: Barry Levinson – Diner
Best Cinematography:
Jordan Cronenweth – Blade Runner
Best Music Score:
James Horner and The BusBoys – 48 Hrs.
Best Foreign Film:
The Road Warrior (Mad Max 2) • Australia
Runner-up: The Long Good Friday • UK
Experimental/Independent Film/Video Award:
Wayne Wang – Chan Is Missing
New Generation Award:
Melissa Mathison
Career Achievement Award:
Robert Preston
Special Citation:
Carlo Rambaldi (for the body of his work)

References

External links
8th Annual Los Angeles Film Critics Association Awards

1982
Los Angeles Film Critics Association Awards
Los Angeles Film Critics Association Awards
Los Angeles Film Critics Association Awards
Los Angeles Film Critics Association Awards